Pleurotomella fragilis is an extinct species of sea snail, a marine gastropod mollusk in the family Raphitomidae.

Description

Distribution
Fossils of this marine species were found in Eocene strata in Île-de-France, France.

References

 Brébion (P.), 1992 Quelques Cônes et Pleurotomes du Lutétien du Bassin de Paris. Cossmanniana, hors série, vol. 1, p. 1-25

External links
 G.E. Deshayes (1834), Description des coquilles fossiles des environs de Paris

fragilis
Gastropods described in 1834